Aurora Consurgens is the sixth studio album by the power metal band Angra. It was released in October 2006 by Paradoxx Music in Brazil and SPV label Steamhammer in the rest of the world. This is the last album to feature drummer Aquiles Priester.

Description
The title comes from the medieval text of the same name attributed to Thomas Aquinas, which was later used by Carl Jung for relating dreams to the different states of mind. The album is not a concept album as Temple of Shadows was, but it rather focuses all lyrics on the different mental disturbances, such as suicide, schizophrenia, sociopathy, bipolar disorder, etc. The cover was also taken from an illustration of the Aurora consurgens book.

The album is heavier than its predecessors, although maintaining the regional influences, rhythms and arrangements that mark the band. The composition process involved all members this time, resulting in more diverse music.

The drums were recorded in House of Audio Studios in Germany under the production of Dennis Ward; the remaining members were recorded in "Via Musique" studios in São Paulo, Brazil, under the co-production of Thiago Bianchi (Karma and Shaman).

A single called "The Course of Nature" was released as a virtual single for download in the band's official website.

The Japanese edition of the album comes with a bonus track, "Out of This World", which was written in honor of the first Brazilian astronaut, Marcos Pontes. It features Rafael Bittencourt for the first time on the leading vocals.

Track listing

Bonus track (Japanese edition)

Personnel

Edu Falaschi – lead vocals except on #11
Kiko Loureiro – guitars; keyboards & orchestral arrangements on #03, 05, 06, 07, 09, 10; bouzouki on #07
Rafael Bittencourt – guitars; lead vocals on #11, all backing vocals, madrigal choirs on #02
Felipe Andreoli – bass, upright bass on #10; intro guitars on #08
Aquiles Priester – drums

Guest musicians
 Mauricio Alves – percussion
 Fabrizio Di Sarno – keyboards & orchestral arrangements on #01, 02, 04, 08
 Rita Maria – madrigal choirs on #02
 Zeca Loureiro – madrigal choirs on #02
 Patricia Zanzoti – madrigal choirs on #02

Charts

References

External links 
 Angra.net – official site
 News article on blabbermouth.net

Angra (band) albums
2006 albums
Albums produced by Dennis Ward (musician)
SPV/Steamhammer albums